Bettsia is a genus of fungi within the Ascosphaeraceae family. This is a monotypic genus, containing the single species Bettsia alvei. Alvei was first described by Annie Betts and this genus is named for her.

References

External links
 Bettsia at Index Fungorum

Onygenales
Monotypic Eurotiomycetes genera